Attack is a 1986 Soviet drama film directed by Igor Nikolayev.

Plot 
The film is about a graduate of a tank school who chooses Karakum, believing that it will be easier on the battlefield than at school.

Cast 
 Sergey Chekan as Timofey Yermakov
 Aleksandr Novikov as Igor Linyov
 Vasili Popov as Pavel Prokhorovich Ordyntsev
 Valeri Tsvetkov
 Svetlana Konovalova as Tatyana Savyelyeva
 Dilorom Igamberdyyeva		
 Oleg Avetisov
 Viktor Chebotaryov
 Sergei Isavnin
 Oleg Demidov

References

External links 
 

1986 films
1980s Russian-language films
Soviet drama films
1986 drama films